Lincoln University (Māori: Te Whare Wānaka o Aoraki) is a New Zealand university that was formed in 1990 when Lincoln College, Canterbury was made independent of the University of Canterbury. Founded in 1878, it is the oldest agricultural teaching institution in the Southern Hemisphere. It remains the smallest university in New Zealand (by enrolment) and one of the eight public universities.

In 2018 Lincoln University had 2695 Equivalent Full Time Students (EFTS) and 633 full-time equivalent staff (188 Academic, 135 Administration and Support, 65 Research and Technical, 273 Farms and Operational).

Lincoln University is a member of the Euroleague for Life Sciences.

History

Lincoln University began life in 1878 as the School of Agriculture of Canterbury University College, opening in July 1880. By 1885 it had 56 students, 32 of them in residence, and all classes were held in the main building (later known as Ivey Hall). The teaching staff included the head of the school William Ivey (who taught agriculture), George Gray (Chemistry and Physics), who remained on staff until 1915, Eric Manley Clarke (mathematics, surveying, and book-keeping; son of the English geodesist Alexander Ross Clarke), and part-time lecturer Thomas Hill (Veterinary Science).

The  college farm was worked by the students, who took part in ploughing, milking, and stock management, as well as taking lectures on agricultural science and chemistry.

From 1896 to 1961 it served students under the name Canterbury Agricultural College, and offered qualifications of the University of New Zealand until that institution's demise. From 1961 to 1990, it was known as Lincoln College, a constituent college of the University of Canterbury, until achieving autonomy in 1990 as Lincoln University. It is the oldest agricultural teaching institution in the Southern Hemisphere. It remains the smallest university in New Zealand.

In March 2009, the Crown Research Institute AgResearch announced that it planned to merge with Lincoln University. However, Lincoln University rejected the plan later that year over financial concerns.
 
On 18 November 2010, after a period of consultation, it was confirmed that a merger between Lincoln University and Telford Rural Polytechnic would go ahead, with the merger taking effect on 1 January 2011.

On 18 June 2013, a new blueprint for the Selwyn campus was announced which included the "Lincoln Hub" concept previously announced by the Government on 29 April 2013.

Management and governance

List of directors, principals, and vice-chancellors
The School of Agriculture, followed by the Canterbury Agricultural College, was under the leadership of a director. From 1962, Lincoln College was headed by a principal, and after becoming Lincoln University in 1990, the role became that of vice-chancellor.

List of chairs of the board of governors and college council, and chancellors
There was a board of governors from 1896 and a college council from 1962. Since full autonomy in 1990, the head of the university council has been the chancellor. The following chairmen and chancellors have served:

† denotes that the person died in office

Student life
Lincoln University Students' Association (LUSA) has been active on campus since 1919. LUSA acts as a representative for students on university policy, as well as providing advocacy services to students and running campus events such as the annual Garden Party and O-Week.

LUSA is central in organising, supporting and funding the clubs on campus. These clubs include but are not limited to; Lincoln Soils Society, Tramping and Climbing Club, Wine Appreciation Club, LSD (Lincoln Snowboarding Department), Alpine Club, LEO (Lincoln Environmental Organisation), Food Appreciation Club, The Lincoln University Campus Choir, Bunch Rides (cycling), Lincoln University Rugby Club, Lincoln Malaysian Students Society (LMSS), International Rugby Club, SPACE (lesbian, gay, bisexual and transgender students on campus), Boxing Club, Young Farmers Club, and Lincoln Christian Fellowship.

In 2018 Lincoln University has 1369 international students (up 10% from the previous year) from 75 countries.

Campus buildings

 The oldest building on campus is Ivey Hall, built in 1878 as the main teaching, administration, and residential building. It was designed in the Jacobethan style by Christchurch architect Frederick Strouts. As well as lecture theatres, laboratories, and a museum, the College Director William Ivey, his family, and the students resided here. A "West Wing" was added in 1881 for additional student accommodation and study rooms (West Ivey was damaged in the 2010 Canterbury earthquake and remains closed). Extensively remodelled and expanded in 1989, Ivey Hall now houses the George Forbes Memorial Library.
 Memorial Hall, designed by Cecil Wood, was built in 1923–24 to commemorate the loss of former Lincoln students who died in World War I; two thirds of the costs were raised by the Old Boy's Students' Association. It later commemorated the dead of World War II. Extensively damaged along with Ivey West in the 2010 Canterbury earthquake, it is now closed to the public and awaiting repair.
 The Laboratories were built in 1929, and became the McCaskill Building, before being replaced by the School of Landscape Architecture Building in 2009. 
The Lodge, a residence for the College Principal, was built in 1945. Until this time the Principal and his family had lived in Ivey Hall.

 The first major hall of residence on campus was Hudson Hall, named after College Principal Eric Hudson: its foundation stone was laid by Prime Minister Peter Fraser in July 1949, and it opened in 1953. Hudson Hall had bed and study accommodation for 184 students. It is now largely an administration building.
 Lincoln University has six halls of residence, of which Hudson Hall is the oldest. Colombo Hall, Lowrie Hall and Stevens Hall all opened in 1970, with Centennial Hall opening in 1978, Lincoln University's centenary year. The newest hall of residence is Southland Hall, built in 1993.
 The George Forbes Building, named after former Prime Minister George Forbes, began construction in 1957 and opened in 1960. This was the college's first purpose-built library, housing 10,000 books. Over the years the library expanded, and the present high-rise building was constructed in 1975. The library eventually outgrew the Forbes Building, and the George Forbes Memorial Library has been housed in Ivey Hall since 1989.
 Gillespie Hall, also known as the Student Union or Lincoln Union, consists of three buildings (Union, Annex, and Link) designed and built between 1962 and 1988. It was named after former Chairman William Gillespie, who had died in 1960. After the 2010 earthquake it was considered earthquake prone, and has been closed since 2010.

 The Hilgendorf Building, constructed in 1968, was designed to cater to 550 full-time students. Named after early Lincoln lecturer Frederick William Hilgendorf, it was a concrete brutalist building, and was badly damaged in the 2010 earthquake and closed for repair. After engineering testing it was deemed unsalvageable and was demolished in 2015.
 The Hilgendorf's companion, the Burns Building, was constructed in a similar style, and the complex of two buildings with their lecture theatres and computer centre were often referred to as the Hilgendorf Wing and Burns Wing. Named after past Principal Malcolm Burns, Burns opened in 1976.
 The Stewart Building, which opened in 1990, is named after another past Principal, James D. Stewart. With two large lecture theatres each seating several hundred, its computerised teaching aids and audiovisual capacity were considered cutting-edge for New Zealand in 1990.
 Built in 1990 to provide lecture and seminar space for a rapidly-increasing intake of Commerce students, the Commerce Building sits on what was the Ivey Hall gardens.
 The cafe and dining hall Mrs O's was built in 2011 to incorporate the original dining hall building, then redesigned for earthquake safety and reopened in 2014. It is named after Mrs Joan O'Loughlin, one of Lincoln College's longest-serving staff (1966–1998), a cleaner and tea attendant much-loved by students.

Academic units
 Faculty of Agribusiness and Commerce: accounting, business management, economics, farm management, finance, marketing and property studies.
 Faculty of Agriculture and Life Sciences: agronomy, plant science, crop physiology, pasture production, animal science, systems biology, computational modelling, food and wine science, entomology; plant pathology and crop protection; ecology, conservation and wildlife management; evolution, molecular genetics and biodiversity.
 Faculty of Environment, Society and Design: natural resources and complex systems engineering, environmental design, resource planning, transport studies, landscape architecture, Māori and indigenous planning and development, recreation management, social sciences, tourism, communication and exercise science.

Research

Lincoln University has had an Entomology Research Collection since the late 1960s, which is now the third-largest entomology collection in New Zealand, containing approximately 500,000 specimens and about 60 types.

Rankings

The New Zealand Tertiary Education Commission's first Performance Based Research Fund ranking exercise in 2003—equivalent to the United Kingdom's Research Assessment Exercise—ranked the quality of Lincoln University's research at sixth place. It also received the highest percentage increase in research funding.

For 2017/18 Lincoln's ranking is 319, released by Quacquarelli Symonds (QS) World University Rankings. Lincoln also has QS Five Stars rating. Lincoln ranks in the top 50 in the fields of Agriculture and Forestry (39th), and also Hospitality and Leisure Management (48th). Lincoln is ranked in the 401–500th bracket according to the 2017 Times Higher Education (THE) world university rankings.

Notable people

Alumni

Richie McCaw – former All Blacks Captain
Sam Whitelock – All Black
Andy Ellis – former All Black
Maggie Barry – National MP
Col Campbell (1933–2012), TV/radio presenter
Turi Carroll – President of the New Zealand Māori Council
David Carter (born 1952), National MP and former Speaker of the House of Parliament
Andy Dalton – former All Black captain
Robbie Deans – former All Black and former Wallabies coach
Jonathan Elworthy (1936–2005), former National MP
John Hayes (born 1948), former diplomat and current National MP 
Rodney Hide (born 1956), former ACT MP
Mark Inglis – mountaineer
Annabel Langbein – cook and author
Don McKinnon (born 1939), former National MP
Jeremy Rockliff – Deputy Premier of Tasmania
Toni Street – television host
Reuben Thorne – former All Blacks Captain
Charles Upham VC & Bar – most highly decorated Commonwealth soldier of WWII
Wilson Whineray – former All Blacks Captain

Honorary degrees

Lincoln University has since 1993 been conferring honorary doctorates.

Faculty

 Margaret Austin
 Roger Field
 Thomas Kirk
 Bianca van Rangelrooy
 Kerry-Jayne Wilson

Rhodes Scholars from Lincoln
1940 Henry Garrett
1951 Lloyd Evans
1986 Forbes Elworthy
1991 Grant Edwards
2019 James Ranstead

See also
Lincoln University Art Collection

Notes

References

External links

 Lincoln University
 History
 George Forbes Memorial Library, Lincoln University
 Lincoln University Research Archive
 Lincoln University Living Heritage
 Lincoln University Students' Association

 
Universities in New Zealand
1878 establishments in New Zealand
Educational institutions established in 1878